Major (Retd.) Muhammad Nawaz Khan (pronounced ; 23 November 1943 – 3 October 2015), was a Pakistani writer, historian, columnist, and poet of the English, Pashto and Urdu languages. His work had mostly been focused on history of the Pashtuns, the Gandhara civilization and the British legacy in Pakistan (specifically, the North Western Region).

Military career
Muhammad Nawaz joined the Pakistan Military Academy as a cadet in the 2nd War Course, right after the Indo-Pakistani War of 1965. He graduated from the academy after a year and joined the 5th FF Regiment as a Second Lieutenant. Nawaz served in the Pakistan Army for twenty five years, from 1966 till 1991. He retired as a Major. During his service with Pakistan Army, he served as 2IC (Second in Command) of his unit. Nawaz also joined the Command and Staff College, Quetta, graduating in 1977. He served as the Wing Commander at Balahisar Fort in Peshawar, Pakistan, the Headquarters of Frontier Corps. During this time, he was also the official historian of Frontier Corps. Nawaz also wrote little bits of history about the Balahisar Fort, which have been placed on twelve plaques at different locations in the Fort. The plaques give visitors a brief history as well as provide interesting trivia about early life in and around the Fort.

Writing career

Nawaz was also a student editor of Pashto section of Khirman, the journal of the College of Agriculture, Peshawar University. He was also a member of National Heritage Foundation and member executive committees of the Kalash Environment Protection Society, Pakistan Heritage Society and Irfan Society. He was also a member of the NWFP government's Roundtable on Cultural Heritage and Sustainable Tourism Development and member of NWFP government's Experts Committee for assisting and advising Departments of Archaeology and Culture regarding protection, preservation and development of cultural, archaeological and architectural heritage of the province. He was also a member of the Task Force on Tourism of the NWFP government.

He participated in many seminars, workshops, conventions, conferences and meetings about cultural heritage and tourism. He also managed Gandhara Markaz, which publishes books/brochures. He started work on the Major Nawaz Research Trust from 20 December 2003, for the help of researchers and scholars.

Major Nawaz worked on a number of history and tourism projects for the Frontier Corps (KPK), Frontier Constabulary, Pakistan Army, Pakistan Air Force, Frontier Corps Foundation, Pakistan Television Corporation, Pearl Continental Hotel, Peshawar and Sarhad Tourism Corporation.

The Gandhara Times
From 1992 to 1996, Major Nawaz, as the proprietor and editor, launched the Gandhara Times, a fortnightly newspaper focusing primarily on the preservation of cultural heritage and promotion of tourism in Pakistan. All copies of the newspaper have been preserved for reference purposes.

Death
Nawaz had been suffering from Parkinson's disease since the mid 1990s. His health deteriorated significantly though, after he fell down and suffered from a broken elbow, in May 2014. The long drawn out fight with Parkinson's disease had made him weak and this injury proved to be a very serious challenge. Nawaz was bedridden for over a year due to weakness. Finally, after fighting Parkinson's Disease for almost 20 years, Nawaz died in Risalpur, Khyber Pakhtunkhwa, Pakistan on 3 October 2015.

Publications
 Goluna au Azghi (ګُلُونا او ازغۍ) (Pashto Poetry) 1965
 Khush Qismata Gadba (خوش قسمَتَ ګډبه) (Pashto Folk Poetry) 1968
 Shum (شُوم) (Pashto Novel) 1968
 Ishq-e-Rasul (عِشقِ رسوُل ) (Pashto Naat), 1968
 History of the 5th Battalion the Frontier Force Regiment 1969
 Hasad Ki Aag (حَسَد کۍ آگ) (Urdu Novelette) 1969
 Tarikh-e-Shahbaz Garhi (تاريخِ شهباز گڑھی) (Urdu) 1910
 The Bala Hisar Fort Peshawar 1987
 The Frontier Constabulary (Major Write Up) 1993
 The Guardians of the Frontier (The Frontier Crops NWFP) 1994
 Malakand A Journey through History. 1995
 Kund National Park (Tourist Guide) 1996
 Malakand, Dir, Swat & Chitral (Tourist Guide) 1996
 The Glorious Piffers 1996
 Hazara (Tourist Guide) 1996
 Shuhada-e-Tirwanja (شُهَدَاعِ تِروَنجا) (Urdu) 1997
 The Valiant Scouts (Frontier Corps NWFP) 1997
 Ali Mardan Khan's Garden Villa and The Flag Staff House in Peshawar Cantonment
 The Historic Khyber Pass (Tourist. Guide) 1999
 Chakdara. (Tourist Guide). 1999
 The Historic BaIahisar Fort, Peshawar (Tourist Guide) 1999
 De Mataloono Dialai (دَ مَتَلُونو ډالئ) (Pashto) 2001
 Da Nawe Zamane Tapae (دَ نَوی َزمانې ټَپے) (Pashto) 2001
 Peshawar City (Joint Effort) (Tourist Guide) 2001
 Rohtas, The symbol of Sher Shah's Power 2002
 Pakhtun Roots & Pakhtunkhwa: A study in Retrospect 2002
 Peshawar Valley: The Heart of Gandhara (Tourist Guide) 2002
 Southern Areas of NWFP: The Treasure land of Cultural Heritage (Tourist Guide) 2002
 The Tribal Areas (Frontier) Glorious History & Gallant People (Tourist Guide) 2002
 The Malam Jaba Tourist Resort (Tourist Guide) 2002
 The Shandur Pass & Polo (Tourist Guide) 2002
 The Khattaks: A Restless People 2004
 The British and the Pathans 2004
 48 Years of Literary Madness 2004
 The Khyber: The Treasure Land of History 2004
 Peshawar: The Unwritten History, 2004
 Ancient Names (Regions, Cities, Towns, Rivers, People & Places) 2004
 The Forts of Pakistan (North Western Region) 2005
 Da Mataloono Guldasta (دَ مَتَلُونو ګُلدَسته) (Pashto) 2005
 The British Cemeteries in Pakistan (North Western Region) 2005
 The Gandhara Times, Fortnightly was regularly published from: 1992 to 1996 and all the copies have been preserved for reference.

References

External links
  About the Author
  Historian Muhammad Nawaz Khan passes away

1943 births
2015 deaths
Pashtun people
20th-century Pakistani historians
Pakistani military historians
Pakistani military writers
Pakistan Military Academy alumni
21st-century Pakistani historians